KSPO Professional is a Korean UCI Continental cycling team that was founded in 1994, that is sponsored by the Korea Sports Promotion Foundation.

Team roster

Major wins

2011
Stage 2 Tour de Taiwan, Park Sung-baek
2012
Overall Tour de Korea, Park Sung-baek
Stage 2, Park Sung-baek
2013
Stage 2 Tour of Japan, Park Sung-baek
Stage 8 Tour de Korea, Seo Joon-yong
 Road Race Championships, Jung Ji-Min
2014
Stage 8 Tour de Korea, Park Sung-baek
 Road Race Championships, Seo Joon-yong
Stage 3 Tour de Hokkaido, Seo Joon-yong
2015
Stage 5 Tour de Langkawi, Seo Joon-yong
Stages 5 & 6 The Maha Chackri Sirindhon's Cup, Park Sung-baek
2018
Mountains classification Tour de Korea, Kwon Soon-Yeong
2019
Stage 3 Tour of China I, Park Kyoung-ho

References

External links

KSPO Cycling Team's Team List in Cycling Fever

UCI Continental Teams (Asia)
Cycling teams based in South Korea
Cycling teams established in 1994